Syzygium wesa, commonly known as white Eungella gum, is a tree in the Myrtaceae  family, native to Queensland.

References

Myrtales of Australia
Trees of Australia
Flora of Queensland
wesa
Taxa named by Bernard Hyland